Juan Labrin (born November 24, 1956) is an Argentine sprint canoer. He competed in the early 1990s.

At the 1992 Summer Olympics in Barcelona, Labrin was eliminated in the repechages of the K-2 500 m event and the semifinals of the K-4 1000 m event.

References
Sports-Reference.com profile

1956 births
Argentine male canoeists
Canoeists at the 1992 Summer Olympics
Living people
Olympic canoeists of Argentina